Tamarac River may refer to:

 Tamarac River (Red River of the North tributary), Minnesota, United States
 Tamarac River (Red Lake), Minnesota, United States
 Little Tamarac River, Minnesota, United States
 Tamarac River (Gatineau River tributary), Quebec, Canada

See also
 Tamarack River (disambiguation)
 Tamarac (disambiguation)